Scolochilus lautus is a species of beetle in the family Cerambycidae. It was described by Monné and Tavakilian in 1988. It is known from Brazil French Guiana.

References

Phacellini
Beetles described in 1988